1449 Virtanen, provisional designation , is a stony Florian asteroid from the inner regions of the asteroid belt, approximately 9.2 kilometers in diameter. It was discovered on 20 February 1938, by Finnish astronomer Yrjö Väisälä at Turku Observatory in Southwest Finland, and named for Finnish biochemist Artturi Virtanen.

Description 

Virtanen is a member of the Flora family, one of the largest collisional populations of stony asteroids in the main-belt. It orbits the Sun in the inner main-belt at a distance of 1.9–2.5 AU once every 3 years and 4 months (1,210 days). Its orbit has an eccentricity of 0.14 and an inclination of 7° with respect to the ecliptic.

Physical characteristics 

In the Tholen taxonomy, Virtanen is classified as a common S-type asteroid.

Lightcurves 

Virtanens first rotational lightcurve was obtained by astronomers Pierre Antonini and Silvano Casulli in May 2007, followed by Australian astronomer Julian Oey at Leura and Kingsgrove Observatory in June 2008. The lightcurves gave a rotation period of approximately 30.5 hours with a brightness variation of 0.6 magnitude.

Additional periods were obtained from photometric observation in the R and S-band at the Palomar Transient Factory, and from modeled data using the Lowell photometric database and other data sources, which also gave two spin axis of (307.0°, 58.0°) and (89.0°, 61.0°) in ecliptic coordinates, respectively.

Diameter and albedo 

According to the survey carried out by NASA's Wide-field Infrared Survey Explorer with its subsequent NEOWISE mission, Virtanen measures between 9.15 and 9.947 kilometers in diameter, and its surface has an albedo between 0.285 and 0.36.

The Collaborative Asteroid Lightcurve Link assumes an albedo of 0.24 – derived from 8 Flora, the largest member and namesake of its family – and calculates a diameter of 10.31 kilometers with an absolute magnitude of 12.1.

Naming 

This minor planet was named for famous Finnish biochemist Artturi Virtanen (1895–1973), recipient of the 1945 Nobel Prize in Chemistry and president of the Academy of Finland for many years. The official  was published by the Minor Planet Center on 15 February 1970.

References

External links 
 Asteroid Lightcurve Database (LCDB), query form (info )
 Dictionary of Minor Planet Names, Google books
 Asteroids and comets rotation curves, CdR – Observatoire de Genève, Raoul Behrend
 Discovery Circumstances: Numbered Minor Planets (1)-(5000) – Minor Planet Center
 
 

001449
Discoveries by Yrjö Väisälä
Named minor planets
001449
19380220